Nao Kodaira (born 26 May 1986) is a Japanese former long track speed skater who specialised in the sprint distances.

She is the 2018 Olympic champion in the 500 m distance. Kodaira is the first Japanese woman to win an Olympic gold medal in speed skating.

In 2009, she graduated from Shinshu University with a bachelor's degree in education.

Career
At the 2010 Winter Olympics she won a silver medal in the team pursuit event. She placed 5th in the 1000 and the 1500 m events and 12th in the 500 m one at the Olympics. At the 2014–15 World Cup stop in Seoul, South Korea, on 21 November 2014, she won the 500 m event, and she has a total of 25 podium placings in the World Cup. At the 2015 World Single Distance Championships, she won the bronze medal in the 500 m event.

At the 2017 World Single Distance Championships, she became the first Japanese woman to win an individual single distance world title winning the women's 500 m event. She won also silver medal in the 1000 m event at the Championships. At the 2017 World Sprint Championships, she won the women's competition. In the season, she became overall winner of ISU World Cup 500 m cup.

Kodaira took the top step also in every single ISU World Cup one in the 2017–18 season ahead of the Olympics.

She is the current world record holder in the 2×500 metres and the sprint combination, and the former world record holder in the 1000 metres and the team sprint, as well as the current Olympic and Japanese record holder in the 500 metres.

At the 2018 Winter Olympics, Kodaira won gold medal in the women's 500 m event and the silver medal in the women's 1000 m event respectively. In the former, she also set an Olympic record and became the first woman to break the 37-second barrier at sea level, as well as the first female Japanese Olympic champion in speed skating. In April 2022, Kodaira announced that she will retire from speed skating in October after a final race at the national single distances championship to be held in her hometown Nagano.

Records

Personal records

World records

Olympic records

References

External links

1986 births
Japanese female speed skaters
Speed skaters at the 2010 Winter Olympics
Speed skaters at the 2014 Winter Olympics
Speed skaters at the 2018 Winter Olympics
Speed skaters at the 2022 Winter Olympics
Olympic speed skaters of Japan
Medalists at the 2010 Winter Olympics
Medalists at the 2018 Winter Olympics
Olympic medalists in speed skating
Olympic gold medalists for Japan
Olympic silver medalists for Japan
Speed skaters at the 2011 Asian Winter Games
Speed skaters at the 2017 Asian Winter Games
Medalists at the 2011 Asian Winter Games
Medalists at the 2017 Asian Winter Games
Asian Games medalists in speed skating
Asian Games gold medalists for Japan
Asian Games bronze medalists for Japan
Sportspeople from Nagano Prefecture
Universiade medalists in speed skating
Living people
World Single Distances Speed Skating Championships medalists
World Sprint Speed Skating Championships medalists
Universiade gold medalists for Japan
Universiade silver medalists for Japan
Universiade bronze medalists for Japan
Speed skaters at the 2007 Winter Universiade
Competitors at the 2009 Winter Universiade
Medalists at the 2007 Winter Universiade
21st-century Japanese women